Pseudostrangalia cruentata is a species of beetle in the family Cerambycidae, the only species in the genus Pseudostrangalia.

References

Lepturinae